Shirley A. Smoyak is a nurse and academic who has had a significant impact on the field of psychiatric nursing.

Biography
After earning bachelor's and master's degrees in nursing and a doctorate in sociology, Smoyak became a faculty member at Rutgers University. She has taught courses both in nursing and in the social sciences. She has been the editor-in-chief of the Journal of Psychosocial Nursing and Mental Health Services since 1981. Smoyak was appointed to oversee reform efforts at Greystone Park Psychiatric Hospital in New Jersey. Some of her most recent research examines the effects of energy drinks on college students.

Smoyak received the 2011 Award for Distinguished Service from the American Psychiatric Nurses Association. She was designated a Living Legend of the American Academy of Nursing in 2004.

See also
List of Living Legends of the American Academy of Nursing

References

Living people
American nurses
American women nurses
Psychiatric nurses
Rutgers University alumni
Rutgers University faculty
Academic journal editors
Year of birth missing (living people)
American women academics
21st-century American women